Marilyn Bowering (born April 13, 1949) is a Canadian poet, novelist and playwright.  As well as several adventure novels and many books of poetry, Bowering has also scripted a number of dramatic works and a libretto.

Early life
Bowering was born in Winnipeg, Manitoba, and grew up in Victoria, British Columbia. She studied English at the University of Victoria, and graduated with a Master of Arts degree.

Career
In 1987, Bowering wrote a book of poetic monologues, titled Anyone Can See I Love You, which was later adapted as a radio drama.  In 1998 she wrote an adventure story, Visible Worlds, which received positive reviews.

In 2012, her book of poetry, Soul Mouth, was published.

In 2013 Bowering worked with composer Gavin Bryars to create the libretto for a chamber opera, Marilyn Forever, about Marilyn Monroe.

Personal
Bowering lives in Sooke, British Columbia; she is married and has one daughter.

Bibliography

Novels
The Visitors Have All Returned - 1979
To All Appearances a Lady - 1989
Visible Worlds - 1997 
Cat's Pilgrimage - 2004
What It Takes to Be Human - 2007

Poetry
The Liberation of Newfoundland - 1973
One Who Became Lost - 1976
The Killing Room - 1977
The Book of Glass- 1978
Sleeping With Lambs - 1980
Giving Back Diamonds - 1982
The Sunday Before Winter - 1984 
Grandfather was a Soldier - 1987
Anyone Can See I Love You - 1987
Calling All the World - 1989
Love As It Is - 1993
Autobiography - 1996 
Human Bodies: Collected Poems 1987-1999 - 1999
The Alchemy of Happiness - 2003 
Green - 2007
Soul Mouth - 2012
Threshold - 2015

Other
Many Voices, An anthology of contemporary Canadian Indian Poetry, co-edited with D. Day. - 1977
In Fine Form: The Canadian Book of Form Poetry, edited by Kate Braid and Sandy Shreve - 2005

Drama
Anyone Can See I Love You - 1988	
Hajimari-No-Hajimari, four myths of the Pacific Rim - 1986	
Temple of the Stars - 1996

Radio
Grandfather was a Soldier - 1983
Anyone Can See I Love You - 1986
Laika and Folchakov, a Journey in Time and Space - 1987
A Cold Departure, the Liaison of George Sand and Frederic Chopin -	1989

Awards
National Magazine Award for Poetry, Gold 1978
Nominated for the 1984 Governor General's Award (The Sunday Before Winter)
National Magazine Award for Poetry, Silver 1989
Long Poem Prize, The Malahat Review, 1994
Pat Lowther Award for poetry, 1997 (Autobiography)
Nominated for the 1997 Governor General's Award (Autobiography)
Nominated for the 1997 Dorothy Livesay Poetry Prize (Autobiography)
Ethel Wilson Fiction Prize, 1998 (Visible Worlds)
Short-listed for the Orange Prize, 1999 (Visible Worlds)
Short-listed for the Dorothy Livesay Poetry Prize, 2004 (The Alchemy of Happiness)
Short-listed for the Ethel Wilson Fiction Prize 2007 (What It Takes to Be Human)

References

External links
 Marilyn Bowering
 Marilyn Bowering fonds at University of Victoria, Special Collections
 Archives of Marylin Bowering (Marylin Bowering fonds, R15614) are held at Library and Archives Canada

1949 births
Living people
Canadian women novelists
Canadian women poets
Writers from Winnipeg
20th-century Canadian novelists
21st-century Canadian novelists
20th-century Canadian poets
21st-century Canadian poets
20th-century Canadian women writers
21st-century Canadian women writers